The geology of Croatia has some Precambrian rocks mostly covered by younger sedimentary rocks and deformed or superimposed by tectonic activity.

The country is split into two main onshore provinces, a smaller part of the Pannonian Basin and the larger Dinarides. These areas are very different.

The carbonate platform karst landscape of Croatia helped to create the weathering conditions to form bauxite, gypsum, clay, spilite, and limestone.

Geography

Elevation ranges from the mountains of the Dinaric Alps with the highest point of the Dinara peak at  near the border with Bosnia and Herzegovina in the south to the shore of the Adriatic Sea which makes up its entire southwest border. Insular Croatia consists of over a thousand islands and islets varying in size, 48 of which permanently inhabited. Karst topography makes up about half of Croatia and is especially prominent in the Dinaric Alps. Croatia's most famous lakes are the Plitvice lakes, a system of 16 lakes with waterfalls connecting them over dolomite and limestone cascades. The lakes are renowned for their distinctive colours, ranging from turquoise to mint green, grey or blue.

Pannonian Basin 

The Pannonian Basin, or Carpathian Basin, is a large basin in Central Europe. The basin mostly is centered on the territory of modern Hungary, but also covers regions of western Slovakia, southeastern Poland, western Ukraine, western Romania, northern Serbia , the tip of northeast Croatia (Slavonia), northeastern Slovenia (Prekmurje), and eastern Austria. The Pannonian Basin is located within the arcuate Carpathian mountain chain that encircles the basin; this chain joins the Alpine mountain system to the west and the Dinaric mountain system to the southwest. The basin is bounded by the intra-Carpathian mountain ranges and basement uplifts. Evidence of the Carboniferous Variscan orogeny remains in Mt. Papuk in the east. The basement is pre-Permian and is made of igneous, metamorphic and sedimentary rocks, with granites, gneisses, schists, and various low-grade metamorphic rocks and seem to have been affected by the Caledonian and Variscan orogenies. In the Pannonian area, Neogene material lies on top of older bedrock, emplaced on the periphery of the Paratethys Ocean. Neogene rocks include marl, conglomerate and sandstone as well as andesite and tuff. In the Drava River valley, the Neogene is seven kilometres thick. Many units contain lignite, and oil is found in lower units.

Dinarides 
Croatia is mostly formed as a part of the Dinarides. The Dinaride region lies outside of the Pannonian Basin to the Southwest.  The Dinarides is a mountain range in Southern and Southeastern Europe, separating the continental Balkan Peninsula from the Adriatic Sea. They stretch from Italy in the northwest through Slovenia, Croatia, Bosnia and Herzegovina, Serbia, Montenegro. The Dinaric Alps extend for approximately  along the western Balkan peninsula from the Julian Alps to the northwest in Italy, downwards to the Šar and Korab massif, where their direction changes. The Dinarides are a wide NW-SE fold-and-thrust belt stretching from southwestern Slovenia to Montenegro along the Adriatic coast of Croatia and inland.

Formation 
The Dinarides formed by subduction and collision processes in the border zone between Europe and Adria tectonic plates. The Adria plate is still pushing the Cenozoic carbonate rocks up on top of the Adriatic lithosphere. Ultramafic ophiolite formed with the opening of a branch of the Tethys Ocean in the Cretaceous, followed by a magmatic activity. With continued continental subduction in the Paleogene, uplift began. The Adriatic Sea is a carbonate platform structural belt with Mesozoic-Paleogene flysch, chert, and limestone superimposed on it. Cenozoic Paleogene rocks unconformably overlie Cretaceous rocks with bauxite, coal and freshwater limestone, overlain by marine limestone from the Eocene and flysch formed in a trough between two carbonate platforms. Sandstone, marl, and limestone deposited in basins now beneath the Adriatic Sea during the Neogene.

Adriatic plate 

The Adriatic Sea and the Po Valley are associated with a tectonic microplate—identified as the Apulian or Adriatic Plate that separated from the African Plate during the Mesozoic era. This separation began in the Middle and Late Triassic, when limestone began to be deposited in the area. Remnants of the former are found in the Adriatic Sea, as well as in the southern Alps and the Dinaric Alps, and remnants of the latter are seen as the Gargano Promontory and the Maiella mountain. In the Eocene and early Oligocene, the plate moved north and north-east, contributing to the Alpine orogeny (along with the African and Eurasian Plates' movements) via the tectonic uplift of the Dinarides and Alps. In the Late Oligocene, the motion was reversed and the Apennine Mountains' orogeny took place. An unbroken zone of increased seismic activity borders the Adriatic Sea, with a belt of thrust faults generally oriented in the northeast–southwest direction on the east coast and the northeast–southwest normal faults in the Apennines, indicating an Adriatic counterclockwise rotation.

An active  fault has been identified to the northwest of Dubrovnik, adding to the Dalmatian islands as the Eurasian Plate slides over the Adriatic microplate. If this movement continues, the seafloor will be completely consumed and the Adriatic Sea closed off in 50–70 million years. In the Middle Adriatic Basin, there is evidence of Permian volcanism in the area of Komiža on the island of Vis and the volcanic islands of Jabuka and Brusnik. Earthquakes have been observed in the region since the earliest historical records. A recent strong earthquake in the region was the 1979 Montenegro earthquake, measuring 7.0 on the Richter scale. Historical earthquakes in the area include the 1627 Gargano peninsula and the 1667 Dubrovnik earthquakes, both followed by strong tsunamis. In the last 600 years, fifteen tsunamis have occurred in the Adriatic Sea.

Natural resources
Coal, oil, gas, and water are the leading natural resources in Croatia.

References

Geology of Croatia